Sanpu railway station is a station of Jingbao Railway in Beijing.

Schedule

See also

List of stations on Jingbao railway

Railway stations in Beijing